37th BSFC Awards
December 11, 2016

Best Film: 
La La Land

The 37th Boston Society of Film Critics Awards, honoring the best in filmmaking in 2016, were given on December 11, 2016.

Winners

 Best Film:
 La La Land
 Best Director:
 Damien Chazelle – La La Land
 Runner-up: Kenneth Lonergan – Manchester by the Sea
 Best Actor:
 Casey Affleck – Manchester by the Sea
 Runner-up: Joel Edgerton – Loving
 Best Actress:
 Isabelle Huppert – Elle and Things to Come
 Runner-up: Natalie Portman – Jackie
 Best Supporting Actor:
 Mahershala Ali – Moonlight
 Best Supporting Actress:
 Lily Gladstone – Certain Women
 Best Screenplay:
 Kenneth Lonergan – Manchester by the Sea
 Runner-up: Jim Jarmusch – Paterson
 Best Original Score:
 Mica Levi – Jackie
 Best Animated Film:
 Tower
 Best Foreign Language Film:
 The Handmaiden
 Runner-up: Things to Come
 Best Documentary:
 O.J.: Made in America
 Best Cinematography:
 Chung Chung-hoon – The Handmaiden
 Runner-up: James Laxton – Moonlight
 Best Editing:
 Tom Cross – La La Land
 Best New Filmmaker:
 Robert Eggers – The Witch
 Best Ensemble Cast:
 Moonlight
 Runner-up: Certain Women

External links
 2016 Winners

References

2014
2016 film awards
2016 awards in the United States
2016 in Boston
December 2016 events in the United States